Olivia Ausoni (20 April 1923 – 15 May 2010) was a Swiss alpine skier. She competed at the 1948 Winter Olympics and the 1952 Winter Olympics.

References

External links
 

1923 births
2010 deaths
Swiss female alpine skiers
Olympic alpine skiers of Switzerland
Alpine skiers at the 1948 Winter Olympics
Alpine skiers at the 1952 Winter Olympics
Sportspeople from the canton of Vaud
20th-century Swiss women